FC Berlin is a Canadian and American soccer club based in Kitchener, Ontario, Canada and Buffalo, New York, USA. The senior men's team competes in United Premier Soccer League and the senior women's team competes in United Women's Soccer.

History

The Berlin Football Academy was founded in 2017 in Kitchener, Ontario, Canada as a youth development soccer academy aimed at preparing players for university and professional soccer opportunities. In the first years, the objective was to provide athletes aged 15–19 with a direct pathway to scholarship opportunities in Canada and the United States. The club's name FC Berlin (Football Club Berlin) pays tribute to the old name of the club's hometown, Kitchener, Ontario (and by extension to its large German community), which was previously known as Berlin, and changed its name after the First World War, following a 1916 referendum. FC Berlin aims to be a fully fan-owned club by 2024, with players receiving the ability to become part-owners of the same club they play for.

After joining the Ontario Soccer Association in 2018, the club successfully achieved its first U21 Regional Championship in the Ontario Soccer League, going 12-1-1 with a first-year program. From there, the club significantly invested in its professional development by launching FC Berlin in July 2020, to provide professional development opportunities for Canadian and American players, announcing the team would enter in the American-based United Premier Soccer League in 2021 and would operate out of Buffalo, New York. While the team operates out of the United States to play in the UPSL, they were able to play their first UPSL game in Canada on September 29, 2022, when they took on Chantilly Forever FC, another Canadian club that would operate out of the United States in the league.

In January 2021, they announced their intention to join the Women's Premier Soccer League, where like the men's team they would operate out of Buffalo, while fielding a roster of all-Canadian players. However, they ultimately joined United Women's Soccer for the 2022 season.

Current squad

Men
As of 24 October 2022

Women
As of 22 June 2022

Staff

Current Staff Roster
As of 31 July 2022

Seasons

Men

Women

References

Association football clubs established in 2017
United Women's Soccer teams
United Premier Soccer League teams
Soccer clubs in Ontario
Soccer clubs in New York (state)